The  Laurentian Mixed Forest Province, also  known as the North  Woods, is a forested ecoregion in eastern North America. Among others, this terminology has been adopted by the Minnesota Department of Natural Resources.  Similar, though not necessarily entirely identical regions, are identified by the United States Environmental Protection Agency as Northern Lakes and Forests, and by the World Wildlife Fund by regions such as the Western Great Lakes forests and Eastern forest-boreal transition.

Geography
In the United States, it consists of a broad region of northern Minnesota, Wisconsin and Michigan (Northern Michigan and the Upper Peninsula) and the forested areas of the North Country (New York) and New England. In Canada, it is found in Ontario around the Great Lakes and the Saint Lawrence River through Quebec to Quebec City.

Nearly all of the region was covered by glaciers during the last ice age, which created many lakes and wetlands throughout the region.  The poor soils and cool climate in this region were not conducive to farming for early settlers, which resulted in the regrowth of most of the forest after being cleared during the 19th and early 20th centuries.  With the abundant lakes and streams and regrowth of the forests, the region became a major tourist and recreation area for the larger population centers just to the south.

Ecology

The area  is a temperate broadleaf and mixed forests biome transition zone between the true boreal forest  to the north and the Big Woods and Carolinian forest to the south, with characteristics of each.  It has areas of both  broadleaf and conifer forest cover, and bodies of water ranging from lakes to conifer bogs  and swamps. Conifers  include pines, spruces, firs, and junipers; deciduous types include aspens, paper birches, mountain ash and maples. It is often said to have a distinct smell, which is attributed partially to the presence of sweet fern and balsam poplar.

The climate for the region roughly corresponds with USDA Plant Hardiness Zones 3a through 4b, although in New England the region extends into zone 5a. The forest region is adapted to the Humid continental climate with warm, humid summers and cold, snowy winters. The Köppen climate classification is Dfb.

During the lumbering era, unrestricted logging and the resulting fires destroyed much of the forest.  With the advent of fire suppression and forest management, the resulting second-growth forest differed substantially from the original forest cover.  Conifer tree species became less common in the resulting forest. Early successional tree species such as aspen and birch became much more prevalent and replaced much of the mixed conifer and deciduous forests that originally existed prior to the logging era.

Major animal species inhabiting the forest include white-tailed deer, moose, porcupine, beaver, the American red squirrel, the eastern gray squirrel, chipmunk, opossum, raccoon, bobcat, Canada lynx, fisher, American marten, long-tailed weasel, ruffed grouse, spruce grouse, bald eagle, red-tailed hawk, osprey, common loon, Duck, Canada goose, wild turkey, sandhill crane, snowshoe hare, the American black bear, coyote, and red fox.

After being nearly extirpated from the conterminous United States, Gray wolf survived in the remote northeastern corner of Minnesota and Ontario. The repopulation of wolves in this region has occurred naturally as they have expanded their territory. Lone cougar have been documented moving through the region, but these appear to consist of solitary young males dispersing from the Great Plains, and little evidence of breeding populations is currently known to exist in the region. Elk have been reintroduced in northern Wisconsin, Michigan, and Ontario after having been extirpated prior to the 20th century by overhunting and habitat loss. The boreal woodland caribou used to inhabit the American portions of the region, but with the destruction of the original forest during the late 19th and early 20th centuries and the resulting expansion of the white-tailed deer population (which carry the deadly Parelaphostrongylus tenuis brain worm parasite), the species is now confined to Canada.

See also

Carolinian forest
North Country Trail
Temperate broadleaf and mixed forests

References 

Temperate broadleaf and mixed forests
Temperate broadleaf and mixed forests in the United States
Ecoregions of Canada
Ecoregions of the United States